Verkhnechirsky is a rural locality (a khutor) in Novomaximovskoye Rural Settlement, Surovikinsky District, Volgograd Oblast, Russia. The population was 778 as of 2010. There are 3 streets.

Geography 
Verkhnechirsky is located in steppe, near the right bank of the Tsimlyansk Reservoir, 54 km southeast of Surovikino (the district's administrative centre) by road. Novomaximovsky is the nearest rural locality.

References 

Rural localities in Surovikinsky District
Don Host Oblast